Perryman is a surname. Notable people with the name include:

Bob Perryman (born 1964), American football player
Chief Perryman, tribal chief of the Muscogee people
Denzel Perryman, American football player
Jill Perryman (born 1933), Australian actress and singer
Lou Perryman (1941–2009), American character actor
Margot Perryman (born 1938), British artist
Michael Perryman, British astronomer, known for his work leading the Hipparcos and Gaia space astrometric projects
Parson Perryman (1888–1966), baseball player
Ryan Perryman (born 1976), American basketball player
Stephen Perryman (born 1955), English cricketer
Steve Perryman (born 1951), English football player
Wayne Perryman, American Christian leader
Willie Perryman (1911–1985), American blues piano player, better known as Piano Red and Dr Feelgood

Given name
Matthew Perryman Jones (born 1973), American singer-songwriter

See also
10969 Perryman, an asteroid
Borders Buses, bus operating company based in Scotland formerly known as Perryman's Buses
Perryman, Maryland, census-designated place in Harford County, Maryland, USA